Samak is a census-designated place (CDP) in southwestern Summit County, Utah, United States. The population was 287 at the 2010 census. The name is simply the reversal of the name of the nearby city of Kamas.

Geography

Demographics

As of the census of 2000, there were 161 people, 72 households, and 42 families residing in the CDP. The population density was 34.3 people per square mile (/km2). There were 249 housing units at an average density of 53.1/sq mi (/km2). The racial makeup of the CDP was 98.76% White, 0.62% from other races, and 0.62% from two or more races. Hispanic or Latino of any race were 2.48% of the population.

There were 72 households, out of which 22.2% had children under the age of 18 living with them, 51.4% were married couples living together, 5.6% had a female householder with no husband present, and 40.3% were non-families. 26.4% of all households were made up of individuals, and 2.8% had someone living alone who was 65 years of age or older. The average household size was 2.24 and the average family size was 2.81.

In the CDP, the population was spread out, with 18.6% under the age of 18, 5.6% from 18 to 24, 44.7% from 25 to 44, 23.0% from 45 to 64, and 8.1% who were 65 years of age or older. The median age was 37 years. For every 100 females, there were 106.4 males. For every 100 females age 18 and over, there were 107.9 males.

The median income for a household in the CDP was $40,938, and the median income for a family was $55,938. Males had a median income of $37,188 versus $21,389 for females. The per capita income for the CDP was $15,615. About 9.1% of families and 11.3% of the population were below the poverty line, including 19.8% of those under the age of eighteen and none of those 65 or over.

A small section of houses by the side of Highway 150 actually belongs to unincorporated Summit County, although they are typically treated as being part of Samak for statistical and other purposes. Included in this area is the Samak Smoke House.

Local businesses
Samak is home to the Samak Store and Smoke House, a general store known for its homemade smoked meats, including beef and turkey jerky and trout. The store is operated year-round and is a popular destination for tourists headed into the Uinta Mountains.

Local attractions
The Mirror Lake Highway, a scenic byway that connects Kamas, Utah with Evanston, Wyoming, winds through the heart of Samak. Every summer in mid-June, the highway is used as a route for the mountain stage of the annual High Uintas Classic, a two-day bicycle race that takes participants from Kamas to Evanston.

A sign reading "Beaver Creek Nudist Ranch" is located at the entrance to Samak on Highway 150 just outside the city limits of Kamas. An actual nudist ranch is not known to exist in Samak.

Education
It is in the South Summit School District.

See also

 List of census-designated places in Utah

References

External links

Census-designated places in Summit County, Utah
Census-designated places in Utah
Salt Lake City metropolitan area